Li Hang is the name of:

Li Hang (footballer) (李行, born 1989), Chinese association footballer
Li Hang (snooker player) (李行, born 1990), Chinese snooker player

See also
Li Gang (Song dynasty) (李綱, 1083–1140), regional commander serving the Southern Song dynasty in the 1130s
Li Hang Wui (born 1985), Hong Kong footballer
Li Hsing (李行, 1930–2012) Taiwanese film director, whose Chinese name is exactly the same as the footballer and snooker player
Li (surname 利)
List of people with surname Li